Greene County may refer to:

Greene County, Alabama
Greene County, Arkansas 
Greene County, Georgia
Greene County, Illinois
Greene County, Indiana
Greene County, Iowa 
Greene County, Mississippi
Greene County, Missouri
Greene County, New York
Greene County, North Carolina
Greene County, Ohio
Greene County, Pennsylvania
Greene County, Tennessee
Greene County, Virginia
Green County, Kentucky
Green County, Wisconsin

See also 
 Green County (disambiguation)
 Greene (disambiguation)